Joel Indergand is a French curler.

Teams

References

External links

Living people
French male curlers

Year of birth missing (living people)